Joe Murnan (born 28 September 1983) is an English darts player who plays in Professional Darts Corporation events.

Career

Murnan reached the last 40 of the 2010 Winmau World Masters, losing 3–0 to Filipino Ronald L. Briones.

Murnan qualified for the 2011 UK Open where he reached the last 32. He defeated Mark Dudbridge 9–8 in a close affair, before losing to the 1995 BDO World Darts Champion Richie Burnett 9–6.

In March 2014, he reached the last 32 of the UK Open again, this time being beaten 9–3 by Raymond van Barneveld. Later in the month he progressed to the last 16 of a PDC event for the first time as he beat the likes of Dean Winstanley and Dave Chisnall at the first Players Championship, before losing 6–4 to Andy Hamilton. He won through to the same stage of the third event where he was defeated 6–1 by Gary Anderson. Murnan also qualified for the German Darts Masters, but was eliminated 6–2 by Andy Smith in the first round.

In February 2015 at the German Darts Championship, Murnan beat Michael Barnard 6–5, Ian White 6–4 (averaged 99.72) and Brendan Dolan 6–4 to play in his first PDC quarter-final. He fell 4–0 down to world number one Michael van Gerwen, before closing to 4–3 with a 12 dart leg, but went on to lose 6–4.

In May 2015, at the 10th Players Championship in Crawley, Murnan won his first PDC title and the £10,000 first prize. His run included 6–3 and 6–4 victories over Premier League players Stephen Bunting and Dave Chisnall in the quarter-finals and final, respectively. The win saw him qualify for the World Matchplay for the first time and he trailed Adrian Lewis 7–2 in the opening round. Murnan won four successive legs, but went on to be beaten 10–7 on his televised debut. He was whitewashed 6–0 by Dave Chisnall on his Players Championship Finals debut.

Murnan's title saw him finish the third highest of the non-qualified players on the Pro Tour Order of Merit for the 2016 World Championship. He played 2012 runner-up Andy Hamilton in the first round and, having trailed 2–1 in sets (missing five darts to lead 2–1 himself) and 2–0 down in legs, Murnan managed to pull off a comeback victory to set up a second round match with Alan Norris, which he lost 4–1. He was knocked out in the fourth round of the UK Open 9–8 by Jelle Klaasen. Murnan's first quarter-final of 2016 was at the 11th Players Championship event and he was edged out 6–5 by Joe Cullen. He qualified for the World Series of Darts Finals and again lost 6–5 to Cullen. He was also knocked out in the first round of the Players Championship Finals 6–0 by Jermaine Wattimena.

Mark Webster defeated Murnan 3–0 in the opening round of the 2017 World Championship.

Murnan lost his PDC Tour Card at the end of 2018 despite managing to qualify for the Grand Slam of Darts for the second consecutive year. However, he won it straight back at UK Q-School in January 2019 via the Order of Merit, sealing at least another two years on the ProTour.

During UK Open 2020, he defeated Harald Leitinger and Karel Sedláček, making it again to the fourth round. There he lost 4-10 to Ricky Evans. He did not qualify for any other major tournaments and after losing in the deciding match and deciding leg to Ciaran Teehan during UK Qualification for PDC World Darts Championship 2021 he lost a chance to maintain his Tour card.

World Championship results

PDC
2016: Second round (lost to Alan Norris 1–4)
2017: First round (lost to Mark Webster 0–3)
2022: Second round (lost to Nathan Aspinall 2–3)

Performance timeline

BDO

PDC

 

PDC European Tour

(W) Won; (F) finalist; (SF) semifinalist; (QF) quarterfinalist; (#R) rounds 6, 5, 4, 3, 2, 1; (RR) round-robin stage; (Prel.) Preliminary round; (DNQ) Did not qualify; (DNP) Did not participate; (NH) Not held; (EX) Excluded; (WD) Withdrew

References

External links

English darts players
Living people
1983 births
British Darts Organisation players
Professional Darts Corporation current tour card holders
PDC ranking title winners